Gary Peterson (9 June 1946 – 17 October 1975) was an international speedway rider from New Zealand.

Speedway career 
Peterson became the champion of New Zealand after winning the 1973 New Zealand Championship.

He rode in the top two tiers of British Speedway from 1968 to 1975, riding for various clubs.  In 1970, he topped the league averages during the 1970 British League Division Two season.

In 1975, Peterson died in a crash at Monmore Green Stadium during a Midland Cup match. Riding for Wolves he lost control of his bike and hit a track lighting pylon.

See also
 Rider deaths in motorcycle racing

References 

1946 births
1975 deaths
New Zealand speedway riders
Newcastle Diamonds riders
Wolverhampton Wolves riders
Motorcycle racers who died while racing
Sport deaths in England